Termes is a genus of higher termites in the subfamily Termitinae.  The type genus of its family, it has a pantropical distribution and has included other species, now placed in other genera; there are also a number of extinct species.

Species
The Termite Catalogue lists the following:

 Termes amaralii
 Termes amicus †
 Termes ayri
 Termes baculi
 Termes baculiformis
 Termes bolivianus
 Termes boultoni
 Termes brevicornis
 Termes buchii †
 Termes capensis
 Termes comis
 Termes croaticus †
 Termes drabatyi †
 Termes fatalis
 Termes hauffi †
 Termes hispaniolae
 Termes hospes
 Termes huayangensis
 Termes korschefskyi †
 Termes laticornis
 Termes major
 Termes marjoriae
 Termes medioculatus
 Termes melindae
 Termes nigritus
 Termes obscurus †
 Termes panamaensis
 Termes primitivus †
 Termes propinquus
 Termes riograndensis
 Termes rostratus
 Termes rutoti †
 Termes scheeri †
 Termes schleipi †
 Termes siruguei †
 Termes splendens
 Termes stitzi †
 Termes weismanni †

References

External links 
 
 

Termites
Insects of Asia
Insects of Africa
Insects of South America